Starý Poddvorov is a municipality and village in Hodonín District in the South Moravian Region of the Czech Republic. It has about 1,000 inhabitants.

Geography
It lies in the Kyjov Hills.

History

The first written mention of Starý Poddvorov is from 1704, when the local winemakers started to build houses here and received land in the area of extinct village Potvorov from the Jesuits. After the Jesuit Order was abolished in 1773, it became a part of the Hodonín estate in 1783. Since 1867, it has been a sovereign municipality.

Economy
Starý Poddvorov is known for viticulture and wine-making. The municipality lies in the Slovácká wine sub-region.

Sights
The wooden windmill is the most important sight. This technical monument was built in 1870.

Twin towns – sister cities

Starý Poddvorov is a member of the Charter of European Rural Communities, a town twinning association across the European Union, alongside with:

 Bienvenida, Spain
 Bièvre, Belgium
 Bucine, Italy
 Cashel, Ireland
 Cissé, France
 Desborough, United Kingdom
 Esch (Haaren), Netherlands
 Hepstedt, Germany
 Ibănești, Romania
 Kandava, Latvia
 Kannus, Finland
 Kolindros, Greece
 Lassee, Austria
 Medzev, Slovakia
 Moravče, Slovenia
 Næstved, Denmark
 Nagycenk, Hungary
 Nadur, Malta
 Ockelbo, Sweden
 Pano Lefkara, Cyprus
 Põlva, Estonia
 Samuel (Soure), Portugal
 Slivo Pole, Bulgaria
 Strzyżów, Poland
 Tisno, Croatia
 Troisvierges, Luxembourg
 Žagarė (Joniškis), Lithuania

References

External links

Villages in Hodonín District
Moravian Slovakia